Marvin David Fletes (born 12 November 1997) is a Nicaraguan professional footballer who plays as a defender for Liga Primera club Real Estelí and the Nicaragua national team.

International career
Fletes debuted internationally on 5 September 2019 in a CONCACAF Nations League match against St. Vincent and the Grenadines in a 1–1 draw. On 27 March 2021, he scored his first goal for Nicaragua against Turks and Caicos Islands in a 7–0 2022 FIFA World Cup qualifying victory.

References

External links
 

1997 births
Living people
Nicaraguan men's footballers
Nicaragua international footballers
Association football defenders
C.D. Walter Ferretti players
UNAN Managua players
Diriangén FC players